Die Fahrt nach Bamsdorf is an East German film. It was released in 1956. Its total run time is 39 minutes long. In 1963 on October 6th, Die Fahrt nach Bamsdorf made its TV premier in Finland.

References

External links
 

1956 films
East German films
1950s German-language films
German children's films
1950s German films
German black-and-white films